MRB could refer to:

 Eastern WV Regional Airport, Martinsburg, West Virginia, United States; IATA airport code
 Maidenhead Railway Bridge
 Malaysian Rubber Board
 Manorbier railway station, Wales; National Rail station code MRB
 Maribo railway station, Denmark (code Mrb)
 Mariënberg railway station, Mariënberg, the Netherlands (code Mrb)
 Marijuana-related businesses, business activities that are related to marijuana and might be sanctioned in some countries
 Marina Bay MRT station, Singapore; station abbreviation MRB
 Martinsburg (Amtrak station), West Virginia, United States; Amtrak station code MRB
 Metallica Resources; New York Stock Exchange symbol MRB
 Michael Reilly Burke
 Mobile Riverine Base, see Mobile Riverine Force
 Mortgage revenue bond loan
 MrBookmaker.com cycling team, see Cycle Collstrop
 MRB constant
 MRB Productions
 Murrumbeena railway station, Melbourne, Australia; station code MRB
 Mullamangalath Raman Bhattathiripad, Malayali social reformer and writer 
 Mother Russia Bleeds, a 2016 video game
 Modified reflected binary code, a code similar to a Gray code